Henri-Guillaume Hamal (also Hamalle or Amael; 1685, Liège, nowadays in Belgium3 December 1752 (aged 67), Liège) was a Walloon (i.e. a French-speaking native of the Low Countries) musician, musical director and composer.

He is the first of the Hamal family of musicians, who were pre-eminent in 18th Century Liège, of whom we have knowledge. He spent his whole life in the Prince-Bishopric of Liège, an ecclesiastical principality of the Holy Roman Empire. The Prince-Bishop was a man of consequence: he was a member of the Imperial Diet. The principality was a strategically-important frontier state. When Hamal was born, it was part of the Spanish Netherlands. Between 1688 and 1704, it was much fought over between the French and the Dutch-British allies (themselves allies of the Empire, as part of the Grand Alliance). In 1714, at the end of the War of the Spanish Succession, it became part of the Austrian Netherlands; but the Dutch troops left only in 1718.

He was known as an excellent singer, graceful, tasteful, and expressive. In 1708 or 1709, he married Catherine Corbusier. They had six children, five boys and a girl. His eldest child, Jean-Noël (1709-1778), and his grandson  (1744-1820), son of his youngest child, Dieudonné-Lambert, were also musicians in Liège. He later returned to Liège to take up a position as sous-maîtrise de chapelle in the cathedral organisation, eventually rising to maître de musique.

All sources say that he had a reputation for honesty and probity. He was received by good society in Liège. He composed principally motets, for both accompanied and unaccompanied voices, but also masses, cantatas (in French, Italian and Walloon dialect), a "Tantum ergo", a "Laudate pueri", and a "Te Deum". He had a talent for improvising comic songs in several languages while accompanying himself on the cello. None of his compositions was printed. Some of his manuscripts are recorded as having still been in existence in 1867 and 1901, but all now seem to have been lost. 's impression was that Hamal was agreeable company but a mediocre musician.  thought that Hamal's grandson Henri tended to overstate his grandfather's importance.

Notes

References

Further reading
 
  By .
  By  and Miep Zijlstra.
 
 

1685 births
1752 deaths
Prince-Bishopric of Liège musicians
18th-century classical composers